99% Invisible is a radio show and podcast produced and created by Roman Mars that focuses on design. It began as a collaborative project between San Francisco public radio station KALW and the American Institute of Architects in San Francisco. The show has been distributed by PRX for broadcasting on a number of radio stations and as a podcast on the Radiotopia network. On April 28, 2021, Roman Mars announced in an introduction of a re-released episode that 99% Invisible had been purchased by Sirius XM and marketed as part of its Stitcher Radio brand.

History
The name of the show was derived from a quote by Buckminster Fuller that, "Ninety-nine percent of who you are is invisible and untouchable." The goal of the show is to expose the unseen and overlooked aspects of design, architecture, and activity in the world. Each episode generally focuses on a single topic or specific example of design, often including interviews with architects, experts, or people who have influenced or been influenced by a given urban, industrial, graphic or other design.

In 2014, 99% Invisible began its fourth season, the first in which it had a weekly release schedule. 

2020 staff includes episode producers Delaney Hall, Christopher Johnson, Kurt Kohlstedt, Chris Berube, Emmett FitzGerald, Vivian Le, Joe Rosenberg and assistant producer Abby Madan. The musical composer and Director of Sound is Swan Real and the VP of Strategic Development is Sofia Klatzker Miller. Former staff include Sam Greenspan, Katie Mingle, Sharif Yousseff and Avery Trufelman. Trufleman left to host "Nice Try!" and "The Cut" podcasts.

In April 2021 the company that produces the show (99% Invisible Inc.) was acquired by SiriusXM.

Reception
Critical reception has generally been very positive, with the show garnering acclaim from many notable radio producers and media outlets. Ira Glass of This American Life described the show as "completely wonderful and entertaining and beautifully produced," and Jad Abumrad has said the show "has a kind of rhythm and musicality that you don’t normally find in radio or podcast storytelling." In 2013, Yahoo! News included 99% Invisible on its list of "best podcasts you aren't listening to but should be," and Miranda Sawyer of The Observer highlighted the show, saying "it's just great."

The creator and host of 99% Invisible, Roman Mars, was included in Fast Companys Most Creative People list of 2013 for his work on 99% Invisible, and included on the Most Creative People in Business 1000 in 2014.

As of January 2014 the show was listed with the top fifty podcasts of the iTunes Top Podcasts chart. In 2014, the show had greater than 4,000 listener ratings on iTunes and upwards of 97% gave the show five stars. The show's 2014 episode Structural Integrity was one of nine award winners at the 2015 Third Coast International Audio Festival.

In 2017, 99% Invisible was named as one of the "50 best podcasts" by Time magazine.

Awards

Guest hosts and collaborations
99% Invisible has produced a variety of episodes in collaboration with other producers and radio shows. "The Political Stage", episode 63, was a collaboration with Andrea Seabrook and DecodeDC that focused on the production of campaign trail events. Episode 84B, called "Trading Places with Planet Money," was made with NPR's Planet Money podcast and discusses commodity trading in the context of the 1983 film Trading Places.

Episodes

Articles of Interest
In September 2018, a spinoff series, from producer Avery Trufelman, was released with six episodes focused on the design of clothes. Articles of Interest was published as part of 99% Invisible. Another six episodes were released in June 2020.

Book
In October 2019, publisher Houghton Mifflin Harcourt announced the upcoming book The 99% Invisible City: A Field Guide to the Hidden World of Everyday Design co-authored by podcasters Roman Mars and Kurt Kohlstedt, describing it as "an examination of the design and architecture of our shared urban environs, featuring stories behind overlooked places and things we take for granted." The book was released a decade after the podcast started, in the fall of 2020; and consists of short stories on the history behind everyday urban features and architecture. Roman Mars was interviewed by NPR radio host Lois Reitzes and by MPR's radio host Kerri Miller about the book. Mars also recorded the audiobook version. Christian Donlan of Eurogamer compared his experience with the book to a videogame, speaking to how both the appreciation of architecture and games require an being attuned to fine details, and both involve dynamic, complex systems.

References

External links
 

Audio podcasts
Arts podcasts
2010 podcast debuts
Radiotopia
Educational podcasts
Podcasts adapted for other media
American podcasts
Works about architecture